National Highway 116B (NH 116B) starts from Nandakumar, Purba Medinipur district (junction with NH 116) in West Bengal and ends at Chandaneswar, Balasore district in Odisha. The road passes through Contai and Digha.

See also
 List of National Highways in India (by Highway Number)
 List of National Highways in India
 National Highways Development Project

References

External links
  NH network map of India

National highways in India
116B|116B